Richard Wilson (born February 7, 1956) is a retired American basketball player. He played for the Atlanta Hawks of the National Basketball Association (NBA) from 1978 to 1980.

College career
Wilson graduated from Atherton High School in Louisville, Kentucky.  He played collegiately for the University of Louisville from 1974 to 1978.  As a freshman, Wilson was a reserve on the Cardinals' 1975 Final Four team.  Wilson then entered the starting lineup for the rest of his Louisville career.  As a sophomore, he averaged 14.8 points, 6.3 rebounds and 4.5 assists per game and led the Cardinals to the 1976 National Invitation Tournament.  As a junior, Wilson teamed with freshman backcourt mate Darrell Griffith and led the Cardinals back to the 1977 NCAA tournament, where they lost to UCLA.

In his senior year, the 1977–78 season, Wilson averaged 17.8 points, 5.2 rebounds and 4.5 assists as he led the Cardinals to a Metro Conference championship and was named MVP of the 1978 Metro Conference men's basketball tournament.  Wilson was named Metro Conference player of the year that season.

Professional career
Following his senior season, Wilson was drafted in the second round of the 1978 NBA Draft by the Atlanta Hawks (25th pick overall).  He played in 81 games as a rookie in 1978–79, averaging 3.0 points, 1.2 rebounds and 1.2 assists per game in a reserve role.  The next season, Wilson played in 5 games before being released by the Hawks.  He finished the season with the Utica Olympics of the Continental Basketball Association (CBA).  The next season, Wilson played with the Atlantic City Hi-Rollers.

Life after basketball

Wilson became a regular contributor in professional softball, playing the outfield for the Kentucky Bourbons of the United Professional Softball League from 1981 to 1982, helping Kentucky to a World Series title in 1981 in a 5-3 series victory over the New England Pilgrims.  Wilson left the Bourbons early in the 1982 season.

Wilson went to work for the Jefferson County, Kentucky sheriff's department, but resigned in 1990 with a conviction for dealing cocaine.  Battling an addiction, Wilson was later sentenced on a probation violation and ordered to a work-release program, but was sentenced to 10 years in prison after a shooting incident.

References

1956 births
Living people
21st-century African-American people
African-American basketball players
American men's basketball players
Atherton High School alumni
Atlanta Hawks draft picks
Atlanta Hawks players
Atlantic City Hi-Rollers players
Basketball players from Louisville, Kentucky
Louisville Cardinals men's basketball players
Point guards
Shooting guards
Utica Olympics players
20th-century African-American sportspeople